Iowa Highway 6 may refer to one of the following highways:
 U.S. Route 6
 Iowa Primary Road No. 6, now part of US 30
 Iowa Highway 6 (1926–1931), became Iowa Highway 60 (renumbered as Iowa 5 and Iowa 17)